The year 2010 was the 39th year after the independence of Bangladesh. It was also the second year of the second term of the Government of Sheikh Hasina.

Incumbents

 President: Zillur Rahman
 Prime Minister: Sheikh Hasina
 Chief Justice: Md. Tafazzul Islam (until 7 February 2010), Mohammad Fazlul Karim (from 8 February to 30 September 2010), A.B.M. Khairul Haque (from 1 October 2010)

Demography

Climate

Economy

Note: For the year 2010 average official exchange rate for BDT was 69.65 per US$.

Events

Major events by month

February
 25 February: A fire at the Garib & Garib Sweater Factory clothes factory in Gazipur, Bangladesh kills at least 18 people and injures more than 50 others.

March
 24 March: Tiny South Talpatti Island off the coast of Bengal disappears, washed away thirty years after the mud flat island was created by delta currents, ending the Indian and Bangladeshi dispute over the territory.
 25 March: International War Crime Tribunal is formed in the purpose of justice for 1971 genocide.

April
 8 April: The Bangladesh Army distributes drinking water among more than 12 million people in Dhaka as fears grow over the city's water crisis.
 8 April: 29 paramilitary troops are convicted of mutiny and imprisoned for up to seven years at a Bangladeshi tribunal.
 17 April: A severe storm strikes Bangladesh and eastern India, killing more than 100 people and destroying over 50,000 homes.

May
 23 May: Musa Ibrahim becomes the first Bangladeshi mountain climber to reach the top of Mount Everest. He reached the summit around 5:05am BST on 23 May 2010 and hoisted the flag of Bangladesh on the apex of the world at around 5:16am BST. From then, Bangladesh became the 67th Mount Everest conquering country.

June
 3 June: At least 116 people are killed and more than 100 injured in a large fire in Dhaka, Bangladesh.

October
 13 October: Bangladesh Climate Change Trust is established through the passage of the Climate Change Trust Act, 2010.
 17 October: Bangladesh Cricket Team whitewashes New Zealand national cricket team, getting a flawless 5-0 ODI series win, during the New Zealand cricket team tour of Bangladesh.

November
 20 November: Holly Islamic festival, the Eid-ul-Azha is celebrated in the whole country.

Awards and recognitions

International Recognition
 A.H.M. Noman Khan, a community leader promoting the cause of disabled people, was awarded Ramon Magsaysay Award.
 Fazle Hasan Abed, founder of BRAC, was awarded Honorary Knighthood by the Queen Elizabeth II.
 Muhammad Yunus, founder of Grameen Bank, was presented Congressional Gold Medal awarded by United States Congress.

Independence Day Award

Ekushey Padak
 Sayeed Ahmed, literature (posthumous)
 Mohammad Alam, photojournalism (posthumous)
 Ahmed Imtiaz Bulbul, music artiste
 Hanif Sangket, social personality
 Laila Hasan, artiste
 Imdad Hossain, artist
 Helena Khan, literature
 Partha Pratim Majumder, mime artiste
 Muntassir Mamoon, research
 Sangharaj Jyotipal Mohathero, social personality (posthumous)
 Golam Moula, Language Movement (posthumous)
 Mohammad Rafiq, literature
 AKM Abdur Rouf, artist (posthumous)
 ASHK Sadik, social personality (posthumous)
 Nasiruddin Yousuff, artiste

Sports
 Asian Games:
 Bangladesh participated at the 16th Asian Games in Guangzhou, China. Bangladesh won a gold, a silver and a bronze medal in the tournament. They won the gold and silver in men's and women's Cricket, while the Bangladesh national kabaddi team won bronze medal in kabaddi.
 Commonwealth Games:
 Bangladesh participated in  the 2010 Commonwealth Games held in Delhi, India. Shooter Asif Hossain Khan and Abdullah Hel Baki won bronze medal in Men's 10m Air Rifle (Pairs).
 South Asian (Federation) Games:
 Bangladesh hosted the 2010 South Asian Federation Games from 29 January to 8 February. With 18 golds, 23 silvers and 56 bronzes Bangladesh ended the tournament at the third position in overall points table.
 Football:
 Bangladesh participated in the 2010 AFC Challenge Cup held in Sri Lanka. They started the tournament well by defeating strong Tajikistan, but then lost to Myanmar and Sri Lanka to exit the tournament from the group stage.

 Cricket:
 In January India visited Bangladesh to play 2 test matches, which they won. The test series was followed by a tri-series involving the host Bangladesh, India and Sri Lanka. Bangladesh did not manage to win any match in the series.
 Bangladesh toured New Zealand for a single Test match, a three-match ODI series, and one Twenty20 International from 3 to 19 February. This was 'The National Bank' Series. Bangladesh lost all their matched on this tour.
 Later in March, The England cricket team toured Bangladesh to play three One Day Internationals (ODI) and two Test matches. The visitors won all the matches.
 Then The Bangladesh cricket team toured England, playing three One Day Internationals and two Test matches between 27 May and 12 July and again returned without any victory.
 The New Zealand cricket team toured Bangladesh from 5 to 17 October 2010. Five One Day Internationals (ODIs) were scheduled: Bangladesh won four and the other was abandoned without play. This was Bangladesh's first series victory against a full-strength Test-playing nation (excepting the West Indies series plagued by strike). Shakib Al Hasan was the player of the series.
 The Zimbabwe national cricket team toured Bangladesh, playing 5 ODI matches from 1 to 12 December. Bangladesh won the 5 match series 4–1.
 Golf:
 Bangladeshi golfer Siddikur Rahman won Brunei Open as part of 2010 Asian Tour.

See also 
 2010s in Bangladesh
 List of Bangladeshi films of 2010
 Timeline of Bangladeshi history

References